Guido Salvini may refer to:

 Guido Salvini (director), Italian film director
 Guido Salvini (judge), Italian judge